Schunemunk Mountain (also spelled Schunnemunk) is the highest mountain in Orange County, New York. The  summit is located in the town of Blooming Grove, with other portions in Cornwall and Woodbury. The community of Mountain Lodge Park is built up its western slope.

The mountain is a popular recreational resource in the area. While only the northeastern quadrant and summit are part of the recently created Schunnemunk State Park, some popular hiking trails and access routes have long crossed the privately owned lands elsewhere on the mountain. Conservationists hope that eventually the state will be able to acquire the whole mountain.

Geography

Schunemunk is a long ridge running approximately northeast-southwest between Smith's Clove and Salisbury Mills. Along the more northerly of its length, the mountain has a double crest, with Barton Swamp lying between the two ridges. The summit lies on the more southeasterly ridge. Barton Swamp is drained by Perry Creek on the south and Baby Brook on the north. Much of the eastern side of the mountain is drained by Dark Hollow Brook. These are part of the Moodna Creek watershed, which encompasses all but the southeastern tip of the mountain. Moodna Creek drains into the Hudson River.  The southeastern part of the mountain drains into the watershed of the Ramapo River.

About midway along its length, on the southeastern side of the mountain, is a spur known as High Knob or High Point, which overlooks Woodbury, New York. To the northwest, across a clove, lies Woodcock Mountain or Woodcock Hill, which reaches .

The New York State Thruway runs alongside Schunemunk's eastern side for the length of the mountain just north of its Harriman exit. In addition to Mountain Lodge Park, two other hamlets in the area are closely associated with the mountain: Mountainville to the northeast and Central Valley to the southeast.

Due to its height and length, Schunemunk can be seen from much of the rest of Orange County and some other nearby areas.

Geology
Schunemunk is geologically dissimilar from nearby mountains in the Hudson Highlands, being formed from sedimentary deposits including conglomerate. Later faulting created the long cleft that is now Barton Swamp.

History
The name "Schunemunk" means "excellent fireplace" in Lenape, and the Lenni Lenape had a village on the northern tip of the mountain. During the American Revolution, the mountain was often the site of skirmishing between Tory and Patriot irregulars.

The mountain is under increasing development pressure, but the northern part has become Schunnemunk State Park, and a small portion of the southern part forms Woodbury Park.

Trails
The Long Path ascends the mountain by way of High Knob, and crosses Perry Creek. When it reaches the Jessup and Highland trails it joins them to Gonzaga Park. The Highlands Trail makes use of several trails on the mountain, ascending the eastern side of the mountain along the Sweet Clover Trail, and following the more southeasterly ridge and crossing the summit by way of the Jessup Trail, which continues along the crest to the southwestern tip of the mountain, ending in Gonzaga Park. The Dark Hollow, Barton Swamp, Trestle, Western Ridge, and Otterkill trails are also located on the mountain.

Fatality
While Schunemunk, like many of the lesser mountains of the American East Coast, is relatively devoid of the usual mountaineering hazards, one fatality has occurred in the recent past. On May 22, 2002, a group of hikers was bushwhacking on a boulder field on the southeastern side of the mountain, above Dark Hollow Brook. Nicholas Styranovski of Astoria, NY had passed the boulder field and gone back to help some of his fellow hikers who were less steady at about noon on May 22, state police said. The field was part of a pre-existing rock slide where boulders came to rest after falling down a steeper slope, said Edward Goodell, the executive director of the New York-New Jersey Trail Conference, an organization that helps maintain the area's hiking paths. A large boulder came loose from above and hit Styranovski and four others, police said.
The informal hiking group – known as the Wednesday Hikers – conducts weekly outings to the Appalachian Mountains and other regional hiking trails, Goodell said. As they hike they discuss their plans for the next week's hikes, he said.

Although the ages and experience levels of the members vary, they are mostly retired people who are skilled hikers, he said.

“They are a great group of people,” Goodell said. “They love nature and they get out there and they have had incident-free hikes for about 30 years.”
The mistake these hikers made was to get spread out with some hikers significantly above others on a field of loose rock so that if a rock was knocked loose it was able to gain enough momentum to injure. Had they all been at the same level a loose rock would be unlikely to hurt someone.

References

 New York–New Jersey Trail Conference Trail Map 8, West Hudson Trails: Schunemunk Mountain

Mountains of New York (state)
Mountains of Orange County, New York
Palisades Interstate Park system
Nature Conservancy preserves in New York (state)